Cilla (Ancient Greek: Κίλλα) in Greek mythology is the name of two women associated with Troy:
 Cilla, a Trojan princess as the daughter of King Laomedon. Her mother was either Strymo, daughter of Scamander, or Placia, daughter of Otreus, or Leucippe.
 Cilla, sister of Hecuba. She was married to Thymoetes, brother of Priam. On the same day that Hecuba bore Paris to Priam, Cilla bore Munippus to Thymoetes. On hearing of the oracle that stated that he must destroy she who had given birth and her child, Priam killed Cilla and her son.

Notes

References 

 Apollodorus, The Library with an English Translation by Sir James George Frazer, F.B.A., F.R.S. in 2 Volumes, Cambridge, MA, Harvard University Press; London, William Heinemann Ltd. 1921. ISBN 0-674-99135-4. Online version at the Perseus Digital Library. Greek text available from the same website.
 Lycophron, The Alexandra  translated by Alexander William Mair. Loeb Classical Library Volume 129. London: William Heinemann, 1921. Online version at the Topos Text Project.
 Lycophron, Alexandra translated by A.W. Mair. London: William Heinemann; New York: G.P. Putnam's Sons. 1921. Greek text available at the Perseus Digital Library.

Trojans
Princesses in Greek mythology